Rose Rana is a Nepali movie producer, actor, businessman and politician. He is General Secretary of the Nepal Film Producer Association.

Early life and education 
Rana (family name Saroj Thapa) was born in Syaulibang village of Pyuthan District. He changed his name to Rose Rana after he moved back to Kathmandu.

Rana entered into movie industry as an actor. He then started producing movies. Some of his movies are Khalanayak, Don, Dosti, Takkar Dui Mutuko, and Ma Chhu Ni Timro.

Politics
Rana is actively involved in Nepali Congress Politics. He was elected President of Pyuthan Constitutional Assembly No 2. 

On Provincial election of Nepal 2022, Rose Ran a has been elected as MLA from Pyuthan "2" on Lumbini Province.

References

Living people
Year of birth missing (living people)
People from Pyuthan District
Nepali Congress politicians from Lumbini Province